Loyal Edwin Knappen (January 27, 1854 – May 14, 1930) was a United States circuit judge of the United States Court of Appeals for the Sixth Circuit and the United States Circuit Courts for the Sixth Circuit and previously was a United States district judge of the United States District Court for the Western District of Michigan.

Education and career

Born in Hastings, Michigan, Knappen received a Bachelor of Arts degree from the University of Michigan in 1873 and read law to enter the bar in 1875, thereafter receiving an Master of Arts degree from the University of Michigan in 1876. He was in private practice in Hastings from 1875 to 1888, also serving as a prosecuting attorney of Barry County, Michigan from 1879 to 1883. He was a Commissioner for the United States District Court for the Western District of Michigan from 1880 to 1888. He was in private practice in Grand Rapids, Michigan from 1888 to 1906 with the law firm of Knappen, Uhl & Bryant, which had been founded as Fletcher & Wanty, and which continues to exist today as Wheeler Upham.

Federal judicial service

Knappen was nominated by President Theodore Roosevelt on December 3, 1906, to a seat on the United States District Court for the Western District of Michigan vacated by the death of Judge George P. Wanty, who had founded the law firm of which Knappen was a partner. He was confirmed by the United States Senate on December 10, 1906, and received his commission the same day. His service terminated on February 8, 1910, due to his elevation to the Sixth Circuit.

Knappen was nominated by President William Howard Taft on January 17, 1910, to a joint seat on the United States Court of Appeals for the Sixth Circuit and the United States Circuit Courts for the Sixth Circuit vacated by Judge Horace Harmon Lurton. He was confirmed by the Senate on January 31, 1910, and received his commission the same day. On December 31, 1911, the Circuit Courts were abolished and he thereafter served only on the Court of Appeals. He was a member of the Conference of Senior Circuit Judges (now the Judicial Conference of the United States) from 1922 to 1923. He assumed senior status on April 15, 1924. His service terminated on May 14, 1930, due to his death in Grand Rapids.

References

Sources
 

1854 births
1930 deaths
Judges of the United States District Court for the Western District of Michigan
United States district court judges appointed by Theodore Roosevelt
20th-century American judges
Judges of the United States Court of Appeals for the Sixth Circuit
United States court of appeals judges appointed by William Howard Taft
People from Hastings, Michigan
University of Michigan alumni
United States federal judges admitted to the practice of law by reading law